Oxbow Airport  is located adjacent to Oxbow, Saskatchewan, Canada.

The Oxbow airport is a well maintained grass runway with permanent lighting for night time landings. It is popular with area flying enthusiasts for practice landings. There are several small hangars. There is no fuel available on site.

See also 
 List of airports in Saskatchewan

References 

Registered aerodromes in Saskatchewan
Enniskillen No. 3, Saskatchewan